Labor rights or workers' rights are both legal rights and human rights relating to labor relations between workers and employers. These rights are codified in national and international labor and employment law. In general, these rights influence working conditions in relations of employment. One of the most prominent is the right to freedom of association, otherwise known as the right to organize. Workers organized in trade unions exercise the right to collective bargaining to improve working conditions.

Labor background 
Throughout history, workers claiming some sort of right have attempted to pursue their interests. During the Middle Ages, the Peasants' Revolt in England expressed demand for better wages and working conditions. One of the leaders of the revolt, John Ball famously argued that people were born equal saying, "When Adam delved and Eve span, who was then the gentleman?" Laborers often appealed to traditional rights. For instance, English peasants fought against the enclosure movement, which took traditionally communal lands and made them private.

The British Parliament passed the Factory Act 1833 which stated that children under the age of 9 could not work, children aged 9–13 could only work 8 hours a day, and children aged 14–18 could only work for 12 hours a day.

Labor rights are a relatively new addition to the modern corpus of human rights. The modern concept of labor rights dates to the 19th century after the creation of labor unions following the industrialization processes. Karl Marx stands out as one of the earliest and most prominent advocates for workers rights. His philosophy and economic theory focused on labor issues and advocates his economic system of socialism, a society which would be ruled by the workers. Many of the social movements for the rights of the workers were associated with groups influenced by Marx such as the socialists and communists. More moderate democratic socialists and social democrats supported worker's interests as well. More recent workers rights advocacy has focused on the particular role, exploitation, and needs of women workers, and of increasingly mobile global flows of casual, service, or guest workers.

Core labor standards 
Identified by the ILO in the Declaration on Fundamental Principles and Rights at Work, core labor standards are "widely recognized to be of particular importance". They are universally applicable, regardless of whether the relevant conventions have been ratified, the level of development of a country or cultural values. These standards are composed of qualitative, not quantitative standards and don't establish a particular level of working conditions, wages or health and safety standards. They are not intended to undermine the comparative advantage that developing countries may hold. Core labor standards are important human rights and are recognized in widely ratified international human rights instruments including the Convention on the Rights of the Child (CROC), the most widely ratified human rights treaty with 193 parties, and the ICCPR with 160 parties. They have been incorporated into different provisions that are related to labor in soft law instruments such as the UN's Global Compact, the OECD Guidelines, and the ILO MNE Declaration.

The core labor standards are:
 Freedom of association: workers are able to join trade unions that are independent of government and employer influence;
 The right to collective bargaining: workers may negotiate with employers collectively, as opposed to individually;
 The prohibition of all forms of forced labor: includes security from prison labor and slavery, and prevents workers from being forced to work under duress;
 Elimination of the worst forms of child labor: implementing a minimum working age and certain working condition requirements for children;
 Non-discrimination in employment: equal pay for equal work.

Very few ILO member countries have ratified all of these conventions due to domestic constraints yet as these rights are also recognised in the UDHR, and form a part of customary international law they are committed to respect these rights. For a discussion on the incorporation of these core labor rights into the mechanisms of the World Trade Organization, see Labour standards in the World Trade Organization. There are many other issues outside of this core, in the UK employee rights includes the right to employment particulars, an itemised pay statement, a disciplinary process at which they have the right to be accompanied, daily breaks, rest breaks, paid holidays and more.

Labor rights issues 
Aside from the right to organize, labor movements have campaigned on various other issues that may be said to relate to labor rights. The labor movement began to improve the working conditions of the workers. Dating back to 1768 the first strike of the New York journeyman tailors protested a wage reduction. This marked the beginning of the movement. Approaching the 18th century, labor unions were formed to improve the working conditions for all of the workers. fought for better wages, reasonable hours and safer working conditions. The labor movement led efforts to stop child labor, give health benefits and provide aid to workers who were injured or retired. The following are explained more in the following sections.

Hour limits 
Many labor movement campaigns have to do with limiting hours in the work place. 19th century labor movements campaigned for an eight-hour day. Worker advocacy groups have also sought to limit work hours, making a working week of 40 hours or less standard in many countries. A 35-hour workweek was established in France in 2000, although this standard has been considerably weakened since then. Workers may agree with employers to work for longer, but the extra hours are payable overtime. In the European Union the working week is limited to a maximum of 48 hours including overtime (see also Working Time Directive 2003).

Child labor 

Labor rights advocates have also worked to combat child labor. They see child labor as exploitative, and often economically damaging. Child labor opponents often argue that working children are deprived of an education. In 1948 and then again in 1989, the United Nations declared that children have a right to social protection.

It is hard for children to fight for their basic rights, especially at the workplace. They are often being under-treated. Employers take advantage of child labor because they lack the ability to bargain collectively and compromise to work at an unpleasant workplace. Almost 95% of child labor occurs in developing countries. An example of an industry in which instances of child labor leading to severe injury or death that have been noted are cobalt mining in the DRC as well as copper mining in Zambia, where children were reported to be participating in all forms of mining at the expense of their education. There is a growing concern that the rising demand for resources that involve child labor for industries such as the production of electric vehicle batteries, will only increase labor rights violations. In India and Pakistan, children work long hours in various industries because of the debt their parents incurred. Poor families sometimes rely on their kids' income to pay bills.In Egypt, about 1.5 million kids under 14 years old are working even though there are child-protective labor laws.

Child labor in the United States 

In the United States, the Fair Labor Standards Act of 1938 (FLSA) restricts the employment of children. The FLSA defines the minimum age for employment to 14 years for non-agricultural jobs with restrictions on hours, restricts the hours for youth under the age of 16, and prohibits the employment of children under the age of 18 in occupations deemed hazardous by the Secretary of Labor.

In 2007, Massachusetts updated their child labor laws that required all minors to have work permits.

Workplace conditions 
Labor rights advocates have worked to improve workplace conditions which meet established standards. During the Progressive Era, the United States began workplace reforms, which received publicity boosts from Upton Sinclair's The Jungle and events such as the 1911 Triangle Shirtwaist Factory fire. Labor advocates and other groups often criticize production facilities with poor working conditions as sweatshops and occupational health hazards, and campaign for better labor practices and recognition of workers rights throughout the world.

Safety and social sustainability 
Recent initiatives in the field of sustainability have included a focus on social sustainability, which includes promoting workers' rights and safe working conditions, prevention of human trafficking, and elimination of illegal child labor from the sustainably sourced products and services. Organizations such as the U.S. Department of Labor and Department of State have released studies on products that have been identified as using child labor and industries using or funded by human trafficking. Labor rights are defined internationally by sources such as the Norwegian Agency for Public Management and eGovernment (DIFI) and the International Finance Corporation performance standards.

Living wage 
The labor movement pushes for guaranteed minimum wage laws, and there are continuing negotiations about increases to the minimum wage. However, opponents see minimum wage laws as limiting employment opportunities for unskilled and entry level workers.

The benefits and costs of foreign direct investments on labor rights are often argued. Payton and Woo's study shows that even though "workers may not see drastic increases in minimum wages but they will benefit marginally from better enforcement of existing minimum wage laws or other protections granted in law, gradually improving overall working conditions, as more FDI flows in."

Migrant workers 
Legal migrant workers are sometimes abused. For instance, migrants have faced a number of alleged abuses in the United Arab Emirates (including Dubai). Human Rights Watch lists several problems including "nonpayment of wages, extended working hours without overtime compensation, unsafe working environments resulting in death and injury, squalid living conditions in labor camps, and withholding of passports and travel documents by employers. Despite laws against the practice, employers confiscate migrant workers' passports. Without their passports, workers cannot switch jobs or return home.
These workers have little recourse for labor abuses, but conditions have been improving. Labor and social welfare minister Ali bin Abdullah al-Kaabi has undertaken a number of reforms to help improve labor practices in his country.

The United Arab Emirates was condemned in a report issued in April 2021 by the Democracy Centre for Transparency calling out the nation for its abuse and discrimination of foreigners and expatriates against Emirati citizens. According to DCT, foreigners and expatriates in the UAE are often subjected to gender and wage discrimination, racialization, trafficking, and forced labor. As per the research conducted by the DCT, these issues remain unreported due to the threat and intimidation from their employers in the form of job loss or fabricated criminal charges. The discrimination and abuse have reportedly continued despite the easing of the Kafala system in the Emirate. The DCT concluded its report urging the UAE to address the issues and put an end to the racial hierarchy and discrimination against non-citizens.

Koelnmesse, the company responsible for managing the pavilion representing Germany at the Expo 2020 reportedly signed an agreement with the Emirati Transguard Group for laundry, cleaning, and security services. Rights groups claim that during the signing of a framework agreement between the two firms, evidence assuring human right due diligence was overlooked. It is said that the firm withheld the passports and wages of the workers earning relatively lesser than the minimum wage and terminated them from the service without notice.

In neighbouring countries such as Qatar there is a similar problem. Qatar has received a lot of criticism over the way it treats it's workers, including those that have worked on FIFA World cup projects.

Undocumented workers 
The right to equal treatment, regardless of gender, origin and appearance, religion, sexual orientation, is also seen by many as a worker's right. Discrimination in the work place is illegal in many countries, but some see the wage gap between genders and other groups as a persistent problem.

Many migrant workers are not getting basic labor rights mainly because they don't speak the local language, regardless of legal status. Some have noticed that they are not getting the correct amount of money on their paycheck while others are underpaid.

Undocumented workers in the United States 
The National Labor Relations Act recognizes undocumented laborers as employees. However, the supreme court case Hoffman Plastic Compounds, Inc. v. NLRB established that backpay could not be awarded to unlawfully fired undocumented employees due to the Immigration Reform and Control Act of 1986. In this court decision, it was also stated that the U.S. would support FLSA and MSPA, without regard to whether or not someone is documented. Undocumented workers also still have legal protection against discrimination based on national origin. The decision of the Hoffman supreme court case primarily has affected undocumented laborers by preventing them from getting backpay and/or reinstatement.

While no undocumented individual is technically able to work in the United States legally, undocumented workers make up 5% of the workforce. In the U.S., people who were born outside of the country tend to work in riskier jobs and have a higher chance of encountering death on the job. The low wage sectors, which many undocumented people work in, have the highest rates of wage and hour violation. Estimates claim that 31% of undocumented people work in service jobs. Restaurant work in particular has a 12% rate of undocumented workers.

Undocumented people can and have joined labor unions, and are even credited by a 2008 dissertation for "reinvigorating" the labor movement. Because the NLRA protects undocumented workers, it protects their right to organize. However the NLRA excludes workers that are agricultural, domestic, independent contractors, governmental, or related to their employers. The right to speak up against labor abuses was protected further by an immigration reform bill in 2013 with the POWER act, which intended to protect employees who spoke out against labor practices from facing detention or deportation.

However, labor unions are not necessarily welcoming of immigrant workers. Within unions, there have been internal struggles, such as when Los Angeles immigrant janitors reorganized service workers. Being a part of the union does not necessarily address all the needs of immigrant workers, and thus winning power within the union is the first step for immigrant workers to address their needs.

Immigrant workers often mobilize beyond unions, by campaigning in their communities on intersectional issues of immigration, discrimination, and police misconduct.

Globalization 
In March 2004, the World Commission on the Social Dimension of Globalization issued a report called "A Fair Globalization: Creating Opportunities for All". The report acknowledges how potential globalization can affect labor rights. Reforming globalization will require cooperation not only within the country but also at the global level. It suggests political authorities to "renew their attention to global solidarity".

Workers' rights advocates have been concerned with how globalization can impact labor rights in different countries. Some international agencies and global corporations see strong enforcement will limit a country's economic growth. As companies outsource their work to workers from lower-wage countries, governments will relax their regulation to attract businesses. As a result, poor countries implement a lower labor rights standard to compete with other countries. Layna Mosley's study shows that collective labor rights have declined since the recent global expansion started. By having multiple countries sign agreements and treaties, labor rights are able to be protected across the globe. However, some countries sign it even though they are not planning to follow the rules. Therefore, there might be room for labor rights practices to suffer.

However, some argued that globalization can improve the labor right enforcement by responding to other country's demands. Governments will act in their national interests, so when an important trading country urges for strong labor rights enforcement, they will act accordingly.

Labor movement discrimination 
Labor unions formed throughout the industries. Labor unions in the crafts discovered difficulty in forming labor unions at different skill levels. These skill groups often got divided in racial and sexist ways. In 1895 the white only International Association of Machinists. Entering the 20th century African Americans moved from the south into the north only to find that there was discrimination in economic opportunities. Racial stereotypes were used to divide the working class and create segregation. This eventually led to the creation of black codes and Jim Crow laws to limit the ability for African Americans to create a living for themselves. The Jim Crow laws passed in the 1800s were laws that forbade African Americans from living in white neighborhoods, along with segregation in public places. these were enforced for public pools, phone booths, hospitals, asylums, jails and residential homes for the elderly and handicapped and more.

Measurement of Labor Rights 
There are several indices that measure labor rights produced by various organizations.  Some focus on collective bargaining and freedom of association including in datasets produced by the International Trade Union Confederation (ITUC), the International Labour Organization (ILO), and Penn State. Others, such as data produced by the V-Dem Institute and UCLA's World Policy Analysis Center focus on other components such as employment discrimination, child labor, and forced labor. 

The ITUC produces the Global Rights Index on an annual basis which rates "countries depending on their compliance with collective labour rights and document violations by governments and employers of internationally recognized rights." The ILO produces the data for Sustainable Development Goal 8.8.2, which measures the "Level of national compliance with labour rights (freedom of association and collective bargaining) based on International Labour Organization (ILO) textual sources and national legislation, by sex and migrant status. In the past, Penn State's Center for Global Workers’ Rights has produced a set of labor rights indicators which use a similar methodology to the ILO, but have wider country coverage.

The V-Dem Institute produces a wide range of data on civil rights and democracy.  This includes data on the prevalence of forced labor and data on civil society organizations, including trade unions.  UCLA's World Policy Analysis center maintains a database on a range of global legal standards including women's rights, disability rights, child labor, and employment discrimination.

See also 

 Decent work
 Economic, social and cultural rights
 Industrial democracy
 Institute for Global Labour and Human Rights
 International Labour Organization
 International Labor Rights Forum
 Journal of Workplace Rights
 Labor rights in American meatpacking industry
 Labour Day
 Labour law
 Occupational safety and health
 Right to work
 Social clause
 Socialism
 Strike action
 Syndicalism
 Smart contract: can be used in employment contracts
 Union organizer
 Worker cooperative
 Workers' council
 Workers' right to access the toilet
 Workplace democracy

References

External links 
 Dataset on collective labor rights across all sovereign states, 1985–2002
 International Labor Rights Forum
 Human Rights Watch
 International Labor Organization
 Workers' rights page at the Bureau of International Labor Affairs, U.S. Department of Labor
 International Network for Economic, Social & Cultural Rights
 ITUC Global Rights Index 2020

 
Labour law